Hastings—Frontenac was a federal electoral district in Ontario, Canada, that was represented in the House of Commons of Canada from 1953 to 1968, and from 1979 to 1980.

Constituency boundaries
This riding was originally created in 1952 from parts of Frontenac—Addington and Hastings—Peterborough ridings.

It consisted of:

(a) the county of Lennox and Addington (excluding the townships of Ernestown, Fredericksburg North and Fredericksburg South, Richmond, Adolphustown, and Amherst Island);

(b) the county of Frontenac (excluding the city of Kingston and the townships of Kingston, Storrington, Pittsburgh, Howe Island, Wolfe Island (including Simcoe Island, Horse Shoe Island and Mud Island)); and

(c) the part of county of Peterborough lying east of and including the townships of Anstruther, Burleigh, Dummer and Asphodel; and

(d) the part of county of Hastings lying north of and including the townships of Rawdon, Huntingdon, Madoc and Elzevir.

The electoral district was abolished in 1966 when it was redistributed between Frontenac—Lennox and Addington, Hastings, Peterborough and Victoria—Haliburton ridings.

Hastings—Frontenac was re-created in 1976 from parts of Frontenac—Lennox and Addington, Hastings, and Victoria—Haliburton ridings.

The new riding consisted of:

(a) the part of the County of Frontenac including and lying north of the Townships of Portland, Loughborough, Storrington and Pittsburg, but excluding the southwest part of the Township of Pittsburg;

(b) the part of the County of Hastings including and lying north of the Townships of Marmora, Madoc and Elzevir; and

(c) the County of Lennox and Addington, but excluding the Township of Armherst Island.

The electoral district changed name in 1981 to Hastings—Frontenac—Lennox and Addington.

Members of Parliament

This riding has elected the following Members of Parliament:

Election results

Hastings—Frontenac 1953-1968

On Mr. Smith's death, 17 March 1959:

Hastings—Frontenac 1979-1980

See also

 List of Canadian federal electoral districts
 Past Canadian electoral districts

External links
Riding history of Hastings—Frontenac 1953-1968 from the Library of Parliament
Riding history of Hastings—Frontenac 1979-1980 from the Library of Parliament

Former federal electoral districts of Ontario